Macquarie Links is not Macquarie Fields or Macquarie Park.

Macquarie Links is a suburb of Sydney, in the state of New South Wales, Australia.

Macquarie Links has been a suburb restricted to local residents since late 2003.

Sports
The suburb is home to "Macquarie Links International Golf Club". The 6,300-metre long, par 72 golf course was designed by Robin Nelson to frame the natural environment of the area.

Development
Development has been completed since 2018 with 14 stages of houses, 3 stages of villas and 2 apartment blocks. The Community has a large pool, 2 tennis courts, 2 BBQs and a Community Centre for use by the residents.

References

Suburbs of Sydney
City of Campbelltown (New South Wales)